The Gemeentelijk Gymnasium is a secondary school in Hilversum, The Netherlands. It offers a classical curriculum, including studies in Latin and Greek. It was established in 1913.

References

External links
 Official website

Educational institutions established in 1913
Gymnasiums in the Netherlands
1913 establishments in the Netherlands